Aphrosylus celtiber is a species of fly in the family Dolichopodidae. It is distributed in Western Europe.

References

Hydrophorinae
Insects described in 1855
Diptera of Europe
Taxa named by Alexander Henry Haliday